Kohneh Kolbad (also Romanized as Kohneh Kolbād and Kohneh Kālbād) is a village in Livan Rural District, Now Kandeh District, Bandar-e Gaz County, Golestan Province, Iran. At the 2006 census, its population was 339, in 84 families.

References 

Populated places in Bandar-e Gaz County